

Key

Selections

References

Jackson State

Jackson State Tigers NFL Draft